Micrurus nattereri is a species of coral snake in the family Elapidae. Specimens have been identified mostly along the upper Orinoco River.

References 

nattereri
Snakes of South America
Reptiles of Brazil
Reptiles of Venezuela
Reptiles of Colombia
Reptiles described in 1952